Pomatocalpa macphersonii, commonly known as the blotched bladder orchid, is an epiphytic or lithophytic orchid with thick, cord-like roots, between two and eight dark green, leathery leaves and up to thirty cup-shaped, yellow flowers with red blotches and a white labellum with red blotches. It usually grows on rainforest trees and is found in New Guinea and tropical North Queensland, Australia.

Description

Flowering occurs from July to October.

Taxonomy and naming
The blotched bladder orchid was first formally described in 1870 by Ferdinand von Mueller as Saccolabium macphersonii. He published the description in Fragmenta phytographiae Australiae from a specimen collected by John Dallachy near Rockingham Bay in Queensland. In 1958 Trevor Hunt changed the name to Pomatocalpa macphersonii. The specific epithet (macphersonii) honours John Alexander MacPherson.

Distribution and habitat
It is found in New Guinea and in Queensland on the Cape York Peninsula and as far south as Rockhampton.

References

Aeridinae
Epiphytic orchids
Orchids of Queensland
Orchids of New Guinea
Plants described in 1880
Taxa named by Ferdinand von Mueller